The Violin Society of America (VSA) is an American organization devoted to makers and dealers of violins, violas, and cellos. It is also open to players of these instruments.

It was founded in 1973, and formerly based in Poughkeepsie, New York.  It is now based in Dallas, Texas.

The society has held an annual convention each year since 1974. It publishes The Journal of the Violin Society of America three times a year.

External links
Official Violin Society of America website — with contact info.

Violin organizations
Music organizations based in the United States
Texas classical music
Arts organizations based in Texas
Organizations based in Dallas
Arts organizations established in 1973
1973 establishments in the United States